Samuel Chase may refer to:

Samuel Chase (1741–1811), signer of Declaration of Independence and Justice of the United States Supreme Court 
Samuel Chase (New York politician) (1789–1838), U.S. Congressman from New York
USS Samuel Chase (APA-26), Arthur Middleton class attack transport manned by the United States Coast Guard during World War II
Samuel Chase House, West Newbury, Massachusetts
Samuel T. Chase, American tennis player